Ulrich A. Hauber (June 28, 1885 – July 1, 1956) was a Catholic priest from the United States, who served as the fifth president of St. Ambrose College in Davenport, Iowa from 1926 to 1930.

Born June 28, 1885 in Bavaria, Germany, Hauber graduated from St. Ambrose College in 1905 and studied for the priesthood at St. Francis Seminary. He was ordained a priest for the Diocese of Davenport in St. Francis, Wisconsin in 1908,  He received a doctorate in biology from the University of Iowa.

Hauber joined the faculty of St. Ambrose College, where he served for 48 years. A nationally known biologist, Hauber was the author of many textbooks, pamphlets and articles. At St. Ambrose College, Hauber was the chairman of the Division of Natural Sciences before becoming the fifth president.  In the four years he was president he finished the construction of Davis Hall and built Lewis Halls. Until Davis Hall was built the entire college had been contained in Ambrose Hall. He also improved the academic standards of the college, which was accredited by the North Central Association on March 24, 1927. After his term as president ended he returned to the classroom.   In 1937 Pope Pius XI named Hauber a Domestic Prelate upon the nomination of Bishop Henry Rohlman.  He also served as chaplain at the Carmelite Monastery in Bettendorf, Iowa. Msgr. Hauber died July 1, 1956, and was the first person to be laid to rest from the Christ the King Chapel.

References

1885 births
1956 deaths
St. Ambrose University faculty
Roman Catholic Diocese of Davenport
Presidents of St. Ambrose University
German emigrants to the United States
People from Davenport, Iowa
Religious leaders from Iowa
Catholics from Iowa
20th-century American Roman Catholic priests
20th-century American academics